ASM Chemical Industries Limited is a chemical manufacturing company in Bangladesh, head office locates in 240 Tejgaon I/A, Dhaka-1208 & factory locates in Tepirbari, Mawna, Sreepur, Gazipur. The factory covers approximately  It is a joint venture company with CBN and aimschemicals for local textile industries.

History 

The factory was built at a cost of $30 million.

Product list 
 Caustic Soda NaOH
 Sodium hypochlorite NaOCl
 Hydrogen Peroxide H2O2
 Calcium hypochlorite (Bleaching powder)  Ca(OCl)2
 Hydrochloric Acid HCl
 Chlorinated Paraffin Wax
 ChlorineCl2

References

External links 
 Official Web Site

Chemical companies of Bangladesh
Manufacturing companies based in Dhaka